Azmaish is a Pakistani family drama television series written by Sameena Aijaz and produced by Dr. Ali Kazmi and Fahad Mustafa under banner Big Bang Entertainment which was aired on ARY Digital. The main cast of the drama includes Kinza Hashmi, Yashma Gill, and Fahad Shaikh.

Cast 

 Yashma Gill as Shiza
 Kinza Hashmi as Nimra (Shiza's step-sister)
 Fahad Shaikh as Basit
 Furqan Qureshi as Rohan (Tufail's nephew)
 Minsa Malik as Samreen (Shiza's sister)
 Shahood Alvi as Tufail (Shiza & Samreen's father)
 Laila Wasti as Almas (Shiza's step-mother)
 Gul-e-Rana (Tufail's sister)
 Mehwish Qureshi as Saima
 Affan Shah as Rafay

References 

Pakistani drama television series
ARY Digital original programming
2021 Pakistani television series debuts